Carex antoniensis is a species of grassy plants that belong to the family Cyperaceae. The species is endemic to Cape Verde, where it only occurs on the island of Santo Antão. It is listed as critically endangered by the IUCN. The specific name refers to the island of Santo Antão.

References

Further reading

antoniensis
Endemic flora of Cape Verde
Flora of Santo Antão, Cape Verde
Taxa named by Auguste Chevalier